From 1957 through 1965, the Springfield Giants were the Single-A and Double-A baseball team affiliate of the New York/San Francisco Giants in the Eastern League. The team played at Pynchon Park in Springfield, Massachusetts.

The Springfield Giants won three consecutive championships in 1959, 1960 (co-champs) and 1961 under manager Andy Gilbert, all leading the way to San Francisco's National League pennant in 1962.

Some Springfield Giants players with Major League experience include: 
Juan Marichal
Felipe Alou
Matty Alou
Tom Haller
Manny Mota
Bill Hands
Jim Ray Hart
Hal Lanier
Frank Linzy
José Pagán
Bob Barton
Al Stanek
Ernie Bowman
Rick Joseph

Sources
Eastern League Baseball
The Encyclopedia of Minor League Baseball, Lloyd Johnson and Miles Wolff, ed., 1997 edition. Durham, North Carolina: Baseball America.

1957 establishments in Massachusetts
1965 disestablishments in Massachusetts
Baseball teams established in 1957
Baseball teams disestablished in 1965
Defunct baseball teams in Massachusetts
Defunct Eastern League (1938–present) teams
New York Giants minor league affiliates
Professional baseball teams in Massachusetts
San Francisco Giants minor league affiliates
Giants